Abdiqadir Kosar Abdi was a Somali military leader. He was a Colonel of the SNA and the third  chairman of the Somali National Movement. He hailed from the Rer Warsama Said (Warabe) of the Habr Yunis

SNM
Kosar was a colonel of the Somali national army and a highly respected veteran of the 1977 Ogaden War. In the early '80s, he was among the many Isaaq military officials who defected from the SNA due to the widespread nepotism and corruption of the Barre regime. Kosar joined the newly formed Somali National Movement and was the leader of its Military wing where he trained and led SNM fighters on many operations against the SNA.   

In 1983 tensions rose between the two ideological camps of the SNM, the religious civilian camp led by Sheikh Yusuf Madar and the secular military officers led by Kosar. This power struggle within the SNM led to the convening of an emergency meeting of the central committee in November 1983 which took place in Harar, Ethiopia. During the meeting, Kosar challenged Sheikh Yusuf for the chairmanship and the issue was put to a vote. Kosar was able to secure 2 thirds of the votes and was declared Chairman, soon after the religious civilians were effectively purged from leadership roles and the movement took on a more militaristic face.  

During his chairmanship, the SNM saw an increase in military activity, with the success rates of operations surging drastically. Under Kosar's leadership, the SNM expanded its relations with the Derg beyond military and security matters into politics which led to a meeting at Dire Dawa between him and Mengistu in 1984. Kosar with his contacts in the SNA was able to recruit many military officers of the Hawiye into the SNM. The influx of defecting southerners into the SNM threatened Barre so much that he arranged the assassination of Kosar. In 1986 while carrying out operations on the Ethiopia border near the Hiiraan region, he was ambushed by gunmen which resulted in his martyrdom.

References 

Chairmen of the Somali National Movement
Year of birth missing
Year of death missing